Hedwig Wangel (1875–1961) was a German stage and film actress.

Life and career
Born as Amalie Pauline Hedwig Simon on September 23, 1875, in Berlin in the German Empire, Hedwig Wangel was the daughter of a music publisher. After studying acting with Max Grube, she made her theatrical debut in 1893 in Urania. Following performances for the remainder of the decade in theaters across Germany, during which she was a member of Max Reinhardt's Deutsches Theater, she then toured England during 1901 and 1902 and the Netherlands during 1902 and 1903, when she retired suddenly, began to provide care for homeless men and women, and assisted the Salvation Army and the Berliner Prisoner Association. Launching her own production company in 1925, she returned to films with the studio UFA the following year. That same year, she also founded the Gate of Hope, an asylum for women who had recently been freed from prison. Ultimately establishing a charitable foundation which bore her name, she recruited fellow artists and leaders in the scientific community to assist with her work and join her organization's leadership board. Among those who volunteered their services were Albert Einstein, Käthe Kollwitz, and the poet Else Lasker-Schüler.

Selected filmography
 The Woman's Crusade (1926) as the woman's porter
 State Attorney Jordan (1926)  as Mrs. Hecker
 The Priest from Kirchfeld (1926)
 Superfluous People (1926) as Duboff's wife
 The Last Horse Carriage in Berlin (1926) as Auguste Lüdecke
 A Modern Dubarry (1927) as Rosalie
 The Sporck Battalion (1927) as Witwe Retelsdorf
 The Convicted (1927)
 Give Me Life (1928)
 Queen Louise (1927) as Frederica Louisa of Hesse-Darmstadt
 Rasputin (1928) as Princess Vorontsov
 Flachsmann the Educator (1930) as Madame von Jan Flemming
 Pension Schöller (1930) as Mrs. Krüger
 Who Takes Love Seriously? (1931) as the landlady
 The Office Manager (1931) as a member of the cycling club
 Gloria (1931) as Frieda
 The Testament of Cornelius Gulden (1932) as Mrs. Winter
 Spell of the Looking Glass (1932) as Witwe Schramm
 Frederica (1932)
 Three from the Unemployment Office (1932) as the welfare lady
 The Escape to Nice (1932) as Ramona's mother
 Under False Flag (1932) as Frl. Schmidt, Garderobiere
 Travelling People (1938) as Yvonne the circus housekeeper
 Liberated Hands (1939) as Mrs. Steinmann
 Enemies (1940) as Liska
 Uncle Kruger (1941) as Queen Victoria
 Comrades (1941)
 What Does Brigitte Want? (1941) as Klara Lehmann
 Beloved World (1942) as Mrs. Pilz
 Violanta (1942) as Mrs. Zureiss
 The Endless Road (1943) as Susan Harper
The Master of the Estate (1943) as Malena, Wirtschafterin
 Die Feuerzangenbowle (1944) as Crey's housekeeper
 Journey to Happiness (1948) as Großmutter Loevengaard
 Amico (1949) as Mrs. Fiebig
 Love '47 (1949) as Madame Beckmann
 Doctor Praetorius (1950)
 Royal Children (1950) as Mrs. von Bockh
 Mathilde Möhring (1950) 
 Hanna Amon (1951) as Mrs. Zorneder
 Roses Bloom on the Moorland (1952)as Kräuterjule
 Everything for Father (1953) as Klara
 Ave Maria (1953) as the matron
 The Village Under the Sky (1953) as Luccia
 Roses in Autumn (1955) as Konsulin Rhode
 Without You All Is Darkness (1956) as Julchen
 The Cheese Factory in the Hamlet (1958)

References

Bibliography
 Shandley, Robert R. Rubble Films: German Cinema in the Shadow of the Third Reich. Temple University Press, 2001.

External links

 

1875 births
1961 deaths
German stage actresses
German film actresses
German silent film actresses
Actresses from Berlin
20th-century German actresses